Aruna de Silva (born 27 March 1961) is a Sri Lankan former first-class cricketer who played for Singha Sports Club.

References

External links
 

1961 births
Living people
Sri Lankan cricketers
Singha Sports Club cricketers
People from Ambalangoda